The University of Illinois Arboretum is a new arboretum, with gardens, currently under construction on the University of Illinois Urbana-Champaign campus. It is located at the intersection of Florida and Lincoln Avenue, Urbana, Illinois, and open daily without charge.

The arboretum has been constructed on the university's south campus farmlands. As of 2017, developed sections are as follows:
 Welcome Garden – an entrance and meeting place.
 Japan House – tea garden (2002), dry or Zen garden (2003). The house itself contains three tea rooms, and is otherwise used for classes and meetings; it is not generally open to the public.
 Hartley Garden (1994) – a  sunken garden with All American Selections trial ground and annual and perennial beddings.
 Idea Garden – six areas including borders, ornamentals, vegetables, children's, and Special Projects.
 Sen Cherry Tree Alleé (2008) – cherry trees added to the Japan House.
 Frank W. Kari walkway (2011) – 1/3 mile and winding around arboretum ponds with educational signs.
 Hosta Garden – native Illinois prairie plants.

Sports facilities

Cross country 
The arboretum is the home course for the Illinois Fighting Illini men's and women's cross country teams since 2003. There are four courses at the arboretum with 4 km, 5 km, 6 km and 8 km distances.

See also 
 List of botanical gardens in the United States

References

External links 

 University of Illinois Arboretum

Arboreta in Illinois
Botanical gardens in Illinois
Arboretum
Urbana, Illinois
Tourist attractions in Champaign County, Illinois
Cross country running courses in Illinois
Illinois Fighting Illini cross country courses
Sports venues in Champaign–Urbana, Illinois